The 2022–23 season is Tottenham Hotspur's 45th successive season in the top flight of the English football league system, 31st season in the Premier League and 117th season in existence. In addition to the domestic league, they are participating in this season's FA Cup, EFL Cup and UEFA Champions League.

Background

Tottenham had an effective start to the 2021–22 Premier League season, winning their first three matches and topping the Premier League table. However, in early November, manager Nuno Espírito Santo was sacked due to poor form. Antonio Conte replaced him a day later while the club sat in ninth. Conte went undefeated in his first nine matches and eventually led the team to a fourth place finish, giving the club a spot in the group stage of this season's UEFA Champions League. The 2022–23 season thus marks Conte's first full season in charge of Tottenham.

Season squad

Transfers

Released

Note: Players will join other clubs after being released or terminated from their contract. Only the following clubs are mentioned when that club signed the player in the same transfer window.

Loans in

Loans out

Transfers in

Transfers out

Pre-season and mid-season friendlies
To prepare for the upcoming season, Tottenham played a series of friendlies across the world. The club first met Korean club Team K League and Sevilla in South Korea for the Coupang Play Series on 13 and 16 July 2022, respectively. The team then travelled to Scotland to play Rangers on 23 July 2022 and played Roma in Israel for the I-Tech Cup the following week.

In December, while the season was halted due to the ongoing 2022 FIFA World Cup, Tottenham announced a mid-season friendly behind closed doors against Scottish side Motherwell on 9 December as well as an additional match at home with reduced capacity to French club Nice on 21 December 2022.

Competitions

Overview

Premier League

League table

Results summary

Results by round

Matches
The Premier League fixtures were announced on 16 June 2022.

FA Cup

Tottenham entered the FA Cup in the third round and were drawn at home to Portsmouth. They were then drawn away to Preston North End in the fourth round, and away to Sheffield United in the fifth round.

EFL Cup

Tottenham entered the competition in the third round as one of the teams competing in UEFA competitions. They were drawn away to Nottingham Forest in the third round.

UEFA Champions League

Group stage 

The draw for the group stage was held on 25 August 2022.

Knockout phase

Round of 16
The draw for the round of 16 was held on 7 November, with Tottenham being paired with Milan.

Statistics

Appearances

Goalscorers

The list is sorted by shirt number when total goals are equal.

Hat-tricks

Own goals

Disciplinary
The list is sorted by shirt number when total cards are equal.

Clean sheets 
The list is sorted by shirt number when total clean sheets are equal.

Awards and nominations

Premier League Manager of the Month

Premier League Player of the Month

Premier League Goal of the Month

Premier League Save of the Month

PFA Premier League Fans' Player of the Month

PFA Premier League Fans' Player of the Year

See also
 2022–23 in English football
 List of Tottenham Hotspur F.C. seasons

References

Tottenham Hotspur
Tottenham Hotspur
Tottenham Hotspur
Tottenham Hotspur
Tottenham Hotspur F.C. seasons